RAISE (Rigorous Approach to Industrial Software Engineering) was developed as part of the European ESPRIT II LaCoS project in the 1990s, led by Dines Bjørner. It consists of a set of tools designed for a specification language (RSL) for software development. It is especially espoused by UNU-IIST in Macau, who run training courses on site and around the world, especially in developing countries.

See also
Formal methods
Formal specification

External links
RAISE Virtual Library entry
RAISE – Rigorous Approach to Industrial Software Engineering
RAISE information from Dines Bjørner

Formal specification languages
Formal methods tools
Software testing tools